Somatochlora georgiana, the coppery emerald, is a species of emerald dragonfly in the family Corduliidae. It is found in North America.

References

Further reading

 

Corduliidae
Articles created by Qbugbot
Insects described in 1925